Attilio Lambertini (3 June 1920 – 25 December 2002) was an Italian racing cyclist. He rode in three editions of Tour de France between 1948 and 1951.

References

External links
 

1920 births
2002 deaths
Italian male cyclists
Sportspeople from Ferrara
Cyclists from Emilia-Romagna